The 1934 All-Big Ten Conference football team consists of American football players selected to the All-Big Ten Conference teams chosen by various selectors for the 1934 Big Ten Conference football season.

All Big-Ten selections

Ends
 Frank Larson, Minnesota (AP-1, FH-1, UP-1)
 Merle Wendt, Ohio State (AP-1, FH-2, UP-2)
 Willis Ward, Michigan (FH-1)
 Bob Tenner, Minnesota (FH-2, UP-1)
 Stan Haukedahl, Wisconsin (UP-2)

Tackles
 Phil Bengtson, Minnesota (AP-1, UP-1)
 Ed Widseth, Minnesota (AP-1)
 Jerry Foster, Iowa (FH-1, UP-2)
 Chuck Galbreath, Illinois (FH-1, UP-1)
 Thomas Austin, Michigan (FH-2)
 Charley Hamrick, Ohio State (FH-2)
 Bruno Vercuski, Indiana (UP-2)

Guards
 Regis Monahan, Ohio State (FH-1, UP-1)
 Bill Bevan, Minnesota (AP-1, FH-1, UP-1)
 Albert Kawal, Northwestern (FH-2)
 Charles W. Bennis, Illinois (FH-2, UP-2)
 Mario Pacetti, Wisconsin (UP-2)

Centers
 Ellmore Patterson, Chicago (AP-1, FH-2, UP-1)
 Gomer Jones, Ohio State (FH-1, UP-2)

Quarterbacks
 Jack Beynon, Illinois (AP-1, FH-1, UP-1)
 Glenn Seidel, Minnesota (FH-2, UP-2)

Halfbacks
 Jay Berwanger, Chicago (AP-1, FH-2, UP-1)
 Duane Purvis, Purdue (AP-1; FH-1 [fullback], UP-1)
 Dick Heekin, Ohio State (FH-1, UP-2)
 Lester Lindberg, Illinois (FH-2)
 Dick Crayne, Iowa (UP-2)

Fullbacks
 Pug Lund, Minnesota (AP-1; FH-1 [halfback], UP-1)
 Stan Kostka, Minnesota (FH-2, UP-2)

Key

AP = Associated Press chosen by the conference coaches for the Associated Press

FH = Francis Schmidt, Ohio State coach for the Newspaper Enterprise Association

UP = United Press

See also
1934 College Football All-America Team

References

1934 Big Ten Conference football season
All-Big Ten Conference football teams